Martin Casey (born 1950) is an Irish retired hurler who played as a midfielder for the Wexford senior team.

Born in Causeway, County Kerry, County Kerry, Casey first played competitive hurling during his schooling at St. Peter's College, Wexford. He arrived on the inter-county scene at the age of seventeen when he first linked up with the Wexford minor team, before later joining the under-21 side. He joined the senior panel during the 1974 championship. Casey went on to play a key role for the team for almost a decade, and won one Leinster medal on the field of play. He was an All-Ireland runner-up on two occasions.

At club level Casey is a one-time All-Ireland medallist with Buffer's Alley. In addition to this he also won three Leinster medals and twelve championship medals in a career that spanned four decades.

Throughout his inter-county career, Casey made 20 championship appearances for Wexford. His retirement came following the conclusion of the 1983 championship.

Honours

Team

St. Peter's College
All-Ireland Colleges Senior Hurling Championship (2): 1967, 1968
Leinster Colleges Senior Hurling Championship (2): 1967, 1968

Causeway
Kerry Under-16 Hurling Championship (1): 1966

Buffer's Alley
All-Ireland Senior Club Hurling Championship (1): 1989
Leinster Senior Club Hurling Championship (3): 1985, 1988, 1992
Wexford Senior Club Hurling Championship (12): 1968, 1970, 1975, 1976, 1982, 1983, 1984, 1985, 1988, 1989, 1991, 1992

Wexford
Leinster Senior Hurling Championship (2): 1976, 1977 (sub)
Leinster Under-21 Hurling Championship (3): 1969, 1970, 1972
All-Ireland Minor Hurling Championship (1): 1968
Leinster Minor Hurling Championship (2): 1967, 1968

References

1950 births
Living people
Causeway hurlers
Buffer's Alley hurlers
Wexford inter-county hurlers
People educated at St Peter's College, Wexford